is a Latin phrase used to describe a global city as the capital of the world. During the ancient times, Rome has been described as the Caput Mundi. Other cities to have been called as the Novum Caput Mundi, or New Capital of the World after the modern period include London, Paris, New York City, and Washington, D.C.

Caput Mundi

Rome

Roma Caput Mundi is a Latin phrase taken to mean "Rome capital of the world" and "Roma capitale del mondo" in Italian (literally: "head of the world"; see capital, capitol). It originates out of a classical European understanding of the known world: Europe, North Africa, and Southwest Asia. The influence of Rome in the ancient world began to grow around the 2nd century BC as the Republic expanded across Southern Europe and North Africa. For the next five centuries, Rome governed much of the known world (of traditional Greco-Roman geography) and served as the world's largest city during that period. The cultural influence of the local language of Rome (Latin) as well as Roman art, architecture, law, religion, and philosophy was significant. The Imperial city of Rome adopted as its nickname Caput Mundi, attributing this to its perception of an enduring power of Ancient Rome and the Roman Catholic Church. Today it still remains one of the most visited cities in the world.

Novum Caput Mundi

London

The former capital of the British Empire, the largest empire in history, and current capital and largest city of the United Kingdom, London is sometimes called the capital of the world. It had been a part of the Roman Empire and has been a major settlement since the epoch of Ancient Rome (known then as Londinium).

London is one of the world's major business, financial, and cultural centres, and exerts influence on its politics, education, technology, entertainment, media, fashion, and the arts all contributing to its status as a leading global city, and it is considered one of the most important global cities. London takes a very important role as a part of the global economy, and the city has sometimes been called the financial capital or centre of the world, as it maintains the largest trade surplus in financial services around the world. In addition, London in time and on maps is on the Prime Meridian, running directly through Greenwich (also known as the Greenwich Meridian), with its time zone as GMT+0 (UTC+0). The decision made at the International Meridian Conference was due to the dominance of the British Empire and the influence of British India and for logistical reasons. Furthermore, London is the home to the British monarch, who is the official head of state of 15 Commonwealth realms and the Head of the Commonwealth, so the symbolical leader of the association of mostly former British territories, covering one quarter of Earth's surface and being home to 1/3 of its population.

London is one of the most visited cities as measured by international (non-British) arrivals and has the busiest city airport system as measured by passenger traffic. It is the leading investment destination, hosting more international retailers and ultra high-net-worth individuals than any other city. London's universities form the largest concentration of higher education institutes in Europe. According to the QS World University Rankings 2015/16, London has the greatest concentration of top class universities in the world, and the city has even been called the educational capital of the world. It is home to world-class institutions such as Imperial College London in science, technology, engineering, and mathematics, the comprehensive University College London, and the London School of Economics in economics, finance, and business.

In 2012, London became the first city to have hosted three modern Summer Olympic Games.
The situation of numerous iconic landmarks, such as Big Ben, St Paul's Cathedral, Tower Bridge, the Houses of Parliament, and Buckingham Palace, as well as modern architecture such as the Gherkin, The Shard, the London Eye, and the O2, drew approximately 16.7 million international tourists in 2013, establishing London as the most visited city in the world for international tourists. The city is also home to the world's largest library and botanical garden.

London was described as the capital of the "empire on which the sun never sets". It has presently the largest foreign-born population of any city and has been ranked as the world's capital city in terms of culture, business, technological readiness, and overall economic clout, as well as attracting the most foreign investment of any global city.

Paris

Since the 17th century, Paris has been one of Europe's major centres of finance, diplomacy, commerce, fashion, gastronomy, science, and the arts. Prior to the Second World War, Paris, like London, was sometimes described as the capital of the world.

Today, Paris remains one of the world's leading business, financial, and cultural centres, and its influence in politics, education, technology, entertainment, media, fashion and the arts all contribute to its status as a major global city.

Greater Paris, comprising Paris and its three surrounding departments, received 38 million visitors in 2019, a record, measured by hotel arrivals. In 2018, measured by the Euromonitor Global Cities Destination Index, Paris was the second-busiest airline destination in the world, with 19.10 million visitors, behind Bangkok (22.78 million) and ahead of London (19.09 million). The city's top cultural attraction in 2018 was the Cathedral of Notre Dame de Paris (13 million visitors), followed by the Basilica of Sacré-Cœur (11 million visitors), followed by the Louvre (9.6 million visitors); the Eiffel Tower (6.1 million visitors); the Centre Pompidou (3.5 million visitors); and the Musée d'Orsay (3.3 million visitors).

Paris is a major railway, highway, and air-transport hub served by international airports, the busiest being Paris–Charles de Gaulle (second busiest airport in Europe). In terms of cargo traffic, the airport is the eleventh busiest in the world and the busiest in Europe, handling 2,102,268 metric tonnes of cargo in 2019. Opened in 1900, the city's subway system, the Paris Métro, serves 5.23 million passengers daily; it is the second-busiest metro system in Europe after the Moscow Metro. Gare du Nord is the 24th-busiest railway station in the world, but the busiest located outside Japan, with 262 million passengers in 2015.

In the academic year 2004–2005, the Paris Region's 17 public universities, with its 359,749 registered students, comprised the largest concentration of university students in Europe. Paris also hosts four of the top ten business schools in the world, including INSEAD, ESSEC, HEC and ESCP Europe.

Paris has one of the largest city GDPs in the world. It ranks as the first city in Europe (and third worldwide) by the number of companies classified in Fortune'''s Fortune Global 500. Paris produced €738 billion (or US$882 billion at market exchange rates) or around 1/3 of the economy of France in 2018. The GDP per capita of the region was €60,100 (or $71,900 at market exchange rates), the highest in France. While the economy of the Paris metropolitan area — the largest in Europe with London—generates around 1/3 of France's GDP or almost $1.0 trillion. Paris has been ranked as the 2nd most attractive global city in the world in 2019 by KPMG. La Défense, Paris's Central Business District, was ranked by Ernst & Young in 2017 as the leading business district in continental Europe, and fourth in the world. The OECD is headquartered in Paris, the nation's financial capital.

In 2018 the GDP of the Paris Region was the largest in Europe, ahead of Nordrhein-Westfalen in Germany. The GDP per capita was the 4th highest in Europe, after Luxembourg, Brussels, and Hamburg.

In 2018, Paris was one of the most expensive cities in the world, along with Singapore and Hong Kong.

New York City

New York City, the most populous city in the United States, is sometimes described by the Latin phrase "Novum Caput Mundi" ("New Capital of the World"); or more commonly by the English phrase, Capital of the World, primarily in reference to Manhattan, the core borough often referred to as simply The City by locals. Often described as the most powerful global city, New York exerts a significant impact upon commerce, finance, media, art, fashion, research, technology, education, and entertainment, and the city's fast pace has inspired the term New York minute. New York is the most photographed city in the world. Home to the headquarters of the United Nations, New York is an important center for international diplomacy and has been described as the cultural, media, financial, and entertainment capital of the world, despite not being the modern governmental capital of the United States or even of New York State (which is Albany). As many as 800 languages are spoken in New York, making it the most linguistically diverse city in the world. LGBT travel guide Queer in the World states,  "The fabulosity of Gay New York is unrivaled on Earth, and queer culture seeps into every corner of its five boroughs". In 2019, New York was voted the greatest city in the world per a survey of over 30,000 people from 48 cities worldwide, citing the city's cultural diversity.

Numerous national and international private corporations have headquarters in New York. Anchored by Wall Street, in Lower Manhattan, New York has been called the world's principal financial center. as well as most economically powerful city Manhattan is home to the New York Stock Exchange and the NASDAQ, the world's two largest stock exchanges per total market capitalization of their listed companies. The New York branch is the most influential in the Federal Reserve, whose monetary policy decisions impact economies globally.

The New York metropolitan area, the largest metropolitan area in the world by urban landmass, is defined by both the metropolitan statistical area (19.9 million residents in 2013) and the combined statistical area (23.5 million residents in 2013). In 2013, the MSA produced a gross metropolitan product (GMP) of nearly US$1.39 trillion, while in 2012, the CSA generated a GMP of over US$1.55 trillion, both ranking first nationally by a wide margin and behind the GDP of only twelve nations and eleven nations, respectively.

New York City is home to many prestigious higher education institutions with the most notable being Columbia University, New York University, and Rockefeller University. These universities are ranked among the top universities in the world, while some of the world's most prestigious institutions such as Princeton University and Yale University remain in the New York metropolitan area. According to Academic Ranking of World Universities, New York has, on average, the best higher education institutions of any global city.

New York has been ranked first among cities across the globe in attracting capital, business, and tourists. Tourism is vital to New York, and many districts and landmarks in New York have become well known, as the city received a record high 66.6 million tourists in 2019. New York is the most photographed city in the world. The Empire State Building has become the global standard of reference to describe the height and length of other structures.  Times Square, at the hub of the Broadway theater district, is nicknamed The Crossroads of the World, The Center of the Universe, and the "heart of the world".

Washington, D.C.

As the capital of the United States and the seat of the U.S. federal government, many of the actions taken by government personnel in Washington, D.C., including those by the U.S. Supreme Court, the U.S. Congress, and the U.S. President, have a large impact on the lives of people across the world. Washington also holds the headquarters of important international organizations whose actions significantly affect people across the world, including the World Bank, the International Monetary Fund, and the Organization of American States. USAID, the U.S. government's leading international aid agency, is also headquartered in the city, as are many prominent global development, humanitarian, and human rights groups. The city is also home to many of the world's leading think tanks, whose scholars and researchers impact U.S. foreign policy as well as the policy of other governments and organizations. Among these think tanks are the Brookings Institution, the Center for Strategic and International Studies, and the Wilson Center. Many other prominent international organizations also have major offices in the Washington, D.C. region, including Human Rights Watch and Amnesty International. Many prominent global media outlets also have their headquarters in the Washington, D.C. region, including The Washington Post. Other media outlets, like CNN, The BBC, and The New York Times, maintain major bureaus in the city.

Additionally, the Federal Reserve, known as the Fed, the United States' Central Bank, is headquartered in the city. Due to the significance of the U.S. dollar as the world's reserve currency, the decisions taken by the Fed have ripple effects across world economies. The city and the surrounding Washington region has also served as the location for many prominent global meetings and engagements. The signing of the North Atlantic Treaty took place in Washington; this treaty established NATO, which took part in the Cold War. By the Cold War's end, Washington, D.C. was dubbed by The Washington Post'' to be the new capital of the world.

See also
 Globalization
 World City

References

History of Rome
Metropolitan areas
Latin political words and phrases
World government